A constitutional referendum was held in Puerto Rico on 6 November 1994. Voters were asked whether they approved of two amendments, one to eliminate the absolute right to bail and the other to increase the number of Supreme Court judges. Both were rejected by 54% of voters, with a turnout of 62.2%.

Results

Eliminating the absolute right to bail

Increasing the number of Supreme Court judges

References

1994 referendums
1994
1994 in Puerto Rico
Constitutional referendums
November 1994 events in North America